Bheemanady  is a village in Kasaragod district in the state of Kerala, India.

Demographics
As of 2011 Census, Bheemanady had a population of 15,688 with 7,582 males and 8,106 females. Bheemanady village had an average literacy of 91.6% higher than the national average of 74% and lower than state average of 94%.

Transportation
The national highway passing through Nileshwaram connects to Mangalore in the north and Kannur in the south. The nearest railway station is Nileshwar on Mangalore-Palakkad line. There are airports at Mangalore and Kannur.

References

Nileshwaram area